Panjiayuan Subdistrict is a subdistrict of Chaoyang District, Beijing, China. The Panjiayuan area is located towards the South end of the East 3rd Ring road. It borders Jinsong Subdistrict to the north, Nanmofang Township to the east, Nanmofang and Shibalidian Townships to the south, and Longtan Lake Park of Dongcheng District to the east. Panjiayuan is famous for its flea markets, and as of 2020, it has a population of 100,272.

The subdistrict got its name from Panjiayao Village within the area, which later changed its name to Panjiayuan.

History 
Panjiayuan Subdistrict was established in 1984, with 45 residents' committees under its control. In 2000, it was reduced to 12 residents's committees.

Administrative Divisions
As of 2021, there are 14 communities within the subdistrict:

Markets
Beijing Antique Market is located at the southwest of Panjiayuan bridge, South road of East third ring road, Chaoyang District, Beijing. Covering an area of 48,500 m2, it is divided into six sections: Roadside stands, Ancient Architecture, Classical Furniture, Modern collection, Sculpture and Stone Engraving, and the Catering section. Trading mostly in antiques, handicrafts, ornaments, and other collectibles, Panjiayuan has an annual revenue of several hundred million yuan. Having more than four thousand shop owners, this market has nearly ten thousand shop assistants in which sixty percent are from the other twenty-eight provinces and municipalities except Beijing. People here come from a variety of backgrounds, there are more than ten minorities of Hui, Man, Miao, Dong, Uighur, Mongolian, Korean, and other ethnic groups of China. Founded in 1992, this market has developed along with the success in business in folk antiques and handicrafts. Diffusing Chinese culture, it has become a large, quaintly classical market of antiques and handicrafts.

Dayanglu Market is one of the largest food markets of Beijing.

See also
 Chaoyang District
 Beijing

References

External links
 https://web.archive.org/web/20081229034157/http://www.thebeijingguide.com/panjia_market/index.html
 http://www.beijingguide2008.com/panjiayuan_market_beijing/panjiayuan_market_beijing.html

Chaoyang District, Beijing
Subdistricts of Beijing